Mario Merola (6 April 1934 – 12 November 2006) was an Italian singer and actor, most prominently known for having rejuvenated the traditional popular Neapolitan melodrama known as the sceneggiata.

He was nicknamed the King of the sceneggiata to be able to give this kind typically a regional and a national popularity and success unknown before, to make a film genre, representing all of this even off the stage, so being able to put a face to sceneggiata.

Biography 
Born into a poor family of Naples, Merola held a number of day jobs ranging from kitchen help to longshoreman at the port of Naples until one of his songs, Malu Figliu, was used successfully in a sceneggiata, promoting him into the limelight. Merola was at the height of his popularity in the 1970s and 1980s.

With the proceeds of the first vocal performances manages to marry Rosa Serrapiglia, on 5 April 1964, with whom he had three children: Roberto (organizer of musical events), Loredana (housewife) and Francesco, singer, too, who in recent years has accompanied the father on numerous occasions, among them the performance at the Festival of Naples in 2001, where they won the first prize with the song L'Urdemo emigrante (The last immigrant).

The first public performance of Merola happens by chance, at the beginning of the sixties, from just had sounded the siren of the lunch break at the port of Naples and Merola, along with colleagues unloaders, walked in the square near the church of Sant 'Anna to the Marshes to attend the party on the occasion of the celebration of the Virgin Mary. The singer who had produce, Mario Trevi, came to the event with a ten-minute delay. In this expectation colleagues Merola led Miscavige to get on stage and perform, for the first time, from before a public.

In 1964, he made his debut at the Festival of Naples with the song Doce e' 'o silenzio (Sweet is the silence), coupled with Elsa Quarta. The next year will be the time to T'aspetto a maggio (wait for you in May) with Achille Togliani and Tu stasera si pusilleco (You will tonight Pusilleco) with Enzo Del Forno. In 1966 he continued his participation in the Festival of Naples with the songs and Femmene e tamorre and Ciento catene (one hundred chains), in 1967 Allegretto ma non-troppo (happy but not too), in 1968 Cchiu' forte (stronger) and Comm'a 'nu Sciummo (like a river) in 1969 with  'O masto (the master), ciente appuntamente (hundred appointments) (which he wrote the music) and Abbracciame (hug) and in 1970 with  'Nnammurato 'e te! (in love with you) and Chitarra rossa (Guitar red). After the interruption of the Festival in 1971, it will be taken thirty years later, in 2001. In this latest edition Merola and his son Francesco, will perform with the song L'urdemo emigrante (the last emigrant), coming to a total of eight investments.

In the 1970s, he went to the White House as the representative of the classic Neapolitan song and there he sang for an hour.

He recorded approximately 40 CDs of sceneggiata music and has extensive credits in filmed versions of this Neapolitan form, newer ones as well as "classical" works from earlier in the 20th century. He toured abroad with a Neapolitan company to bring the sceneggiata to emigrant Italian communities elsewhere.

Becomes a "scout" (contributing among other things to the initial popularity of the young Massimo Ranieri, Nino D'Angelo, and Gigi D'Alessio).

Although better known as a singer, Merola starred in several Italian crime thrillers, usually playing a good-hearted gangster (a guappo).  He starred as crime boss Michele Barresi in Umberto Lenzi's 1979 thriller From Corleone to Brooklyn. One of Merola's most renowned movies was Zappatore, where he plays a father who worked tirelessly to make his son into a lawyer, only to have his son turn his back on him.

On the occasion of the Festival of Sanremo 1994, along with Nilla Pizzi, Wess, Wilma Goich, Manuela Villa, Tony Santagata, Jimmy Fontana, Gianni Nazzaro, Lando Fiorini, Rosanna Fratello and Giuseppe Cionfoli, is part of Team Italy, cosituitosi 's event, and sings the song Una vecchia canzone italiana (An old Italian song), will affect a disc of the same name that contains 12 tracks including one sang together and the other individually by each member of the group, Merola an occasion to affect an unreleased track Acqua salata Blu (salt water blue).

Engages as a composer, in fact, is the author of the music of some songs, including: Ciento appuntamente (1969), Passione Eterna (Eternal Passion) (1972) and Eternamente tua (Eternally Yours) (1973), three of its major topics. whose lyrics were written by Enzo di Domenico.

In 1997, Merola went into coma when he was hospitalized for three weeks at the hospital Vecchio Pellegrini of Naples. That was the most disturbing episode as a crisis cardio-respiratory did fear the worst. On that occasion, for the first time, the sleep was induced by drugs. Merola, on that occasion, he recovered.

On 26 November 2005 Mario Merola was appointed Knight of Malta, together with Bruno Venturini and Mario Trevi.

In 2005, he published his autobiography Napoli solo andata... Il mio lungo viaggio (Napoli one way ... My Long Journey) written with journalist Geo Nocchetti, Merola in the book talks about his life, his achievements, illness and many other things concerning him. The book, Merola, accompanying it also features many photos.

He died aged 72 on 12 November 2006, after having been in intensive care in San Leonardo hospital in Castellammare di Stabia (Naples), with breathing difficulties. The funeral will take place on November 14, in Naples, in the Basilica of Santa Maria del Carmine Maggiore (the same one where Merola was married and also the same when it was celebrated in 1967, the funeral of Totò). Present the political authorities, colleagues and, in the square outside the church, some 40,000 people. At least half of the people followed the coffin in procession to the Monumental Cemetery of Naples, where the artist is buried.

Tributes
During the Festival of Sanremo 2000, the singer Bono Vox of U2, who was performing the song The ground beneath her feet, fell into the pit and came across Mario Merola: once before he pays homage with a bow, while the neapolitan singer applauded him.

Hugo Race in 2004 published The Merola Matrix, an album of 16 songs in which Race uses the voice of old songs and even some movie scenes of Merola making a mix between his music and that of the artist in neapolitan.

In 2005, the singer recorded the album neomelodico Mauro Nardi sings Merola where he plays 16 tracks not belonging to the genus neomelodico, but in the classic neapolitan song, Merola achievements, Nardi that pays homage to running them.

A Mario Merola, some neomelodici have dedicated several songs, including: Faje parte 'e chesta storia (You are part of this story), il grande Merola (The great Merola), al re Merola (King Merola) and Maestro Merola (Master Merola).

In 2008 he opened the restaurant-museum in Naples Felicissima Sera (Happy evening), named after the myth of Mario Merola. The venue accompanied by photos, objects, records, posters, costumes, letters, covers and newspaper headlines of the singer, was born thanks to the children of Roberto and Francesco, Mimmo and Valentino Manna and with the collaboration of the design Nadia Wanderlingh. Among the photos that portray Merola there are those with Diego Armando Maradona, Mike Bongiorno, Franco Franchi, Ornella Muti, Johnny Dorelli, Vittorio Gassman and Adriano Celentano. In the room there is also a letter written by Eduardo De Filippo to Merola dated 29 October 1976.

In 2009, the great singer, in the district Sant'Anna alle Paludi in Naples, is erected a commemorative plaque bust . The plaque created by sculptor Dominico Sepe, reads: Mario Merola ambassador of Neapolitan songs in the world.

On 18 September 2010 the first memorial Mario Merola (a musical event dedicated to the great singer) was held. The concert was held at the Stadio San Ciro Portici has seen the participation of, among others: Francesco Merola, Tullio de Piscopo, Sal Da Vinci, Gigi Finizio, Gianni Fiorellino, Mario Da Vinci, Valentina Stella, Gloriana and Gigi D'Alessio.

In November 2011 was held in the Vigevano Rally in honor of the king of sceneggiata Mario Merola, a concert in honor of Merola which brought together many of his fans from all over Europe.

In 2013 was founded on the YouTube channel Mario-Merola Story, a channel that contains several songs by the great artist.

Festival of Naples 
 1964
 Doce e' 'o silenzio (Acampora – Martingano) with Elsa Quarta, 12th Festival of Neapolitan Song – not finalist
 1965
 T'aspetto a Maggio (Dura – Scuotto – Esposito) with Achille Togliani, 13th Festival of Neapolitan Song – 7th place
 Tu stasera si pusilleco (Amato – E. Buonafede) with Enzo Del Forno, 13th Festival of Neapolitan Song  – not finalist
 1966
 Ciento catene (Chiarazzo – Ruocco) with Maria Paris, 14th Festival of Neapolitan Song – 5th place
 Femmene e Tamorre (E. Bonagura – Lumini) with Daisy Lumini, 14th Festival of Neapolitan Song – not finalist
 1967
 Allegretto ma non-troppo (De Crescenzo – D'Annibale) with Mario Abbate, 15th Festival of Neapolitan Song – 6th place
 Freve 'e gelusia (Chiarazzo – Pelligiano) with Maria Paris, 15th Festival of Neapolitan Song – 9th place
 1968
 Cchiu' forte 'e me (U. Martucci – Colosimo – Landi) with Ben Venuti, 16th Festival of Neapolitan Song – not finalist
 Comm'a nu sciummo (Barrucci – Gregoretti – C. Esposito) with Mario Trevi, 16th Festival of Neapolitan Song – not finalist
 1969
'O Masto (Pelliggiano – Mammone – De Caro – Petrucci) with Antonio Buonomo, 17th Festival of Neapolitan Song – 5th place
 Abbracciame (Romeo – Dura – Troia) with Giulietta Sacco, 17th Festival of Neapolitan Song – 7th place
 Ciento Appuntamente (Langella – Falsetti) with Luciano Rondinella, 17th Festival of Neapolitan Song – 13th place
1970
 Chitarra Rossa (Russo – V. – S. Mazzocco) with Mirna Doris, 18th Festival of Neapolitan Song – 5th place
 'Nnammurato 'e te! (Fiorini – Schiano) with Luciano Rondinella, 18th Festival of Neapolitan Song – 6th place
 'O guastafeste (Moxedano – Colucci – Sorrentino – Cofra) with Luciano Rondinella, 18th Festival of Neapolitan Song – 12th place
 1971
 Was present Stella Nera (Russo – Genta) with Luciano Rondinella, 19th Festival of Neapolitan Song – closed program for organizational reasons
 2001
 L'Urdemo Emigrante (V. Campagnoli – G. Campagnoli – M. Guida – G. Quirito) with Francesco Merola, 24th Festival of Neapolitan Song – 1st place/Winner

Festival of Sanremo 
1994
 Una Vecchia Canzone Italiana (Stefano Jurgens – Marcello Marrocchi) Squadra Italia with Nilla Pizzi, Manuela Villa, Jimmy Fontana, Gianni Nazzaro, Wilma Goich, Wess, Giuseppe Cionfoli, Tony Santagata, Lando Fiorini e Rosanna Fratello, 44th Festival of Italian Song – 19th place

Recordings (selection)

33 rpm 
1967 – Mario Merola (1° album of 1967)|Mario Merola (Zeus, BE 0015)
1967 – Mario Merola (2° album of 1967)|Mario Merola (Zeus, BE 0016)
1970 – 6 sceneggiate cantate da Mario Merola (Zeus, TM 55460)
1972 – Cumpagne ‘e cella, Mario Trevi – Mario Merola (West records, WLP 104)
1972 – Passione eterna (33 giri)|Passione eterna (West records, WLP 101)
1973 – Volume primo (Hello, ZSEL 55404)
1973 – Volume secondo (Hello, ZSEL 55405)
1973 – Canzoni 'nziste (Rifi variety record, ST 19154)
1973 – Madonna verde (Storm, BR 002)
1973 – Tribunale (33 giri)|Tribunale (Storm, BR 004)
1975 – Classiche napoletane Vol. 6 – Merola canta Libero Bovio (Hello, ZSEL 55411)
1975 – Mario Merola e Pino Mauro (Hello, ZSEL 55413)
1975 – 5 sceneggiate cantate da Mario Merola (Hello, ZSEL 55436)
1975 – Vol. 5° (Hello, ZSEL 55441)
1975 – Eternamente tua (Storm, TM 55402)
1976 – Volume quarto (Zeus, ZSV BS 3022)
1977 – Legge d'onore (Lineavis, LV 3376)
1977 – Licenza 'e carcerato (Storm, ZSLTM 55453)
1978 – Canta Napoli (Record, LP)
1978 – 6 sceneggiate (Storm, TM 55474)
1979 – Si chesta e' 'a legge – Vol. 9° (Storm, ZSL TM 55461)
1980 – Zappatore sceneggiata (Hello, ZSEL 55466)
1980 – 'A dolce vita (Lineavis, LV 3302)
1981 – Chiamate Napoli 081 (Storm)
1982 – Carcerato (33 giri)|Carcerato (Storm, TM 55474)
1982 – 'O rre d' 'a sceneggiata (33 giri)|'O rre d' 'a sceneggiata (Storm, TM 55477)

45 rpm 
1963 – Malufiglio/L'urdemo avvertimento (Mario Merola)|Malufiglio/L'urdemo avvertimento (Deafon, CT 001)
1963 – Scugnezziello/'O primmo giuramento (Deafon, CT 004)
1963 – So' nnato carcerato/Quatt'anne ammore (Phonotris, CS 5001)
1963 – Femmena nera/L'ultima buscia (Phonotris, CS 5002)
1963 – Dicite all'avvocato/Nun ce sarrà dimane (Phonotris, CS 5007)
1963 – Quatto mura/Gelusia d'ammore (Phonotris, CS 5008)
1963 – Se cagnata 'a scena/Amici (Phonotris, CS 5009)
1963 – 'O primmo giuramento/Scugnezziello (Phonotris, CS 5010)
1963 – L'urdemo bicchiere/Velo niro (Phonotris, CS 5019)
1963 – Tu me lasse/Malommo (Phonotris, CS 5020)
1964 – Malommo/Tu me lasse (Zeus, BE 117)
1964 – 'A fede (l'urdemo bicchiere)/Velo niro (Zeus, BE 118)
1964 – Canciello 'e cunvento/Dduje sciure arancio (Zeus, BE 121)
1964 – Rosa 'nfamità/Nu poco 'e tutte cose (Zeus, BE 125)
1964 – Doce è 'o silenzio/'Mbrellino 'e seta (Zeus, BE 126)
1964 – Suonno 'e cancelle/Ddoje vote carcerato (Zeus, BE 132)
1964 – 'O zampugnaro/Acale 'e scelle (Zeus, BE 133)
1964  – Te chiammavo Maria/Schiavo senza catene (Zeus, BE 134)
1964  – 'A sciurara/Se ne ghiuta (Zeus, BE 137)
1965  – Tu stasera sì Pusilleco/T'aspetto a maggio (Zeus, BE 144)
1965  – Legge d'onore/Parola d'onore (Zeus, BE 148)
1966 – 'Nu capriccio/'A prucessione (Zeus, BE 178)
1966 – L'ultima 'nfamità/Carmela Spina (Zeus, BE 179)
1966 – Canzona marinaresca/'Nu capriccio (Zeus, BE 180)
1966 – Scetate/'O zampugnaro (Zeus, BE 181)
1966 – Core furastiero/Carmela Spina (Zeus, BE 182)
1966 – Pusilleco addiruso/L'ultima 'nfamità (Zeus, BE 183)
1966 – 'O mare 'e Margellina/Surdate (Zeus, BE 184)
1966 – Canzona marinaresca/Pusilleco addiruso (Zeus, BE 185)
1966 – Femmene e tammorre/Dipende a te (Zeus, BE 188)
1966 – Ciento catene/Tengo a mamma ca m'aspetta (Zeus, BE 189)
1966 – E bonanotte 'a sposa/Mamma schiavona (Zeus, BE 195)
1966 – 'A voce 'e mamma/Surriento d' 'e 'nnammurate (Zeus, BE 196)
1967 – 'A bandiera/Senza guapparia (Zeus, BE 199)
1967 – Allegretto...ma non troppo/'E vvarchetelle (Zeus, BE 203)
1967 – Freva 'e gelusia/N'ata passione (Zeus, BE 204)
1967 – 'E quatte vie/Luna dispettosa (Zeus, BE 207)
1967 – Dal Vesuvio con amore/Fantasia (Zeus, BE 212)
1968 – Ammanettato/Mamma schiavona (Zeus, BE 221)
1968 – Malaspina/Bonanotte 'a sposa (Zeus, BE 222)
1968 – Comm' 'a 'nu sciummo/Malasera (Zeus, BE 224)
1968 – Cchiù forte 'e me/Uocchie 'e mare (Zeus, BE 225)
1969 – 'O Milurdino/Signora 'nfamità (Hello, HR 9022)
1970 – 'Na santa guapparia/Miracolo d'ammore (Hello, HR 9023)
1970 – Nnammurato 'e te!/'O giurnale (Hello, HR 9025)
1970 – Chitarra rossa/Salutammela (Hello, HR 9027)
1970 – L'Urdema Carta/Chella d'o terzo piano (Hello, HR 9034)
1971 – 'A camorra/Amico, permettete! (Hello, HR 9041)
1971 – Stella nera/Cielo e mare (Hello, HR 9056)
1971 – Via nova/Ddoje serenate (Hello, HR 9069)
1971 – Chitarra Tragica/A Montevergine (Hello, HR 9070)
1972 – 'O Festino/'A Legge (Hello, HR 9079)
1972 – Lacreme Napulitane/Tatonno se nne va (Hello, HR 9082)
1972 – Mamma addò stà/Chiove (Hello, HR 9085)
1972 – 'A bravura/'A congiura (Hello, HR 9101)
1972 – Passione eterna/'A dolce vita (Arlecchino, ARL 3001)
1973 – Madonna verde/N'ata passione (Storm, SR 703)
1974 – Eternamente tua/Chi s'annammora 'e te (Storm, SR 713)
1975 – Inferno d'ammore/Vagabondo d'o mare (Edibi, ZEDB 50238)
1981 – Ave Maria/Napoli canta Napoli (Storm, ZTM 50507)

CDs 
1973 – Mario Merola e Giulietta Sacco (Zeus Record)
1975 – 'O Clan d' 'e napulitane
1978 – Mario Merola canta Libero Bovio
1979 – Ave Maria (D.V. More Record)
1980 – Zappatore (D.V. More Record)
1985 – Passione eterna (Video Sound Market, CD 730)
1989 – 'O mare 'e margellina (Zeus Record, ZS 0052)
1990 – Cuore di Napoli (D.V. More Record)
1993 – 'A sciurara (Zeus Record, ZS 0222)
1993 – Quattro mura (Mario Merola)|Quattro mura (Alpha Records, CD AR 7052)
1994 – Trasmette Napoli (Mea Sound, SIAE CD 303)
1994 – Una vecchia canzone italiana (con il gruppo Squadra Italia) (Pravo Music)
1994 – Tangentopoli (album)|Tangentopoli (Mea Sound, MEA CD 351)
1997 – Chiamate Napoli... 081 (D.V. More Record)
1997 – 'E figlie... (D.V. More Record)
1997 – Lacrime napulitane (CD)|Lacrime napulitane (D.V. More Record)
1997 – Carcerato (CD)|Carcerato (D.V. More Record)
1997 – Guapparia (CD)|Guapparia (D.V. More Record)
1998 – Malommo (CD)|Malommo (Replay Music)
2000 – Guaglione 'e malavita – Mario Merola e [[Pino Mauro
2001 – Malavicina (Mea Sound, MEACD 112)
2004 – Auguri vita mia (Mea Sound)
2005 – Gelosia (CD)|Gelosia (D.V. More Record)
2005 – Dicite all'avvocato

Album live
2004 – Mario Merola 40-45-70 (CD)|Mario Merola 40-45-70 (D.V. More Record)
2005 – Merola insieme (with Francesco) (Mea Sound)

Collected partial
1988 – Ciao paisà (D.V. More Record)
1990 – 14 successi (Duck Records)
1991 – Tutto Merola vol. 1 (Bideri)
1991 – Tutto Merola vol. 2 (Bideri)
1999 – Melodie napoletane (D.V. More Record)
2000 – Tutto Merola vol.1/I grandi classici (Bideri)
2000 – Tutto Merola vol.2/I grandi successi (Bideri)
2001 – Quattro mura (Raccolta)|Quattro mura (Fonotil)
2002 – Disco d'oro vol. 1 (D.V. More Record, MRCD 4269)
2002 – Disco d'oro vol. 2 (D.V. More Record, MRCD 4270)
2002 – Da Napoli con amore (D.V. More Record)
2003 – Malommo (Replay Music)
2003 – Napoli – Antologia della canzone napoletana (Retro Gold)
2003 – Monografie napoletane vol. 7 Mario Merola (Duck Records, GRCD-E 6365)
2003 – Monografie napoletane vol. 8 Mario Merola (Duck Records, GRCD-E 6366)
2003 – Monografie napoletane vol. 9 Mario Merola (Duck Records, GRCD-E 6367)
2003 – Cuore di Napoli (raccolta)|Cuore di Napoli (D.V. More Record)
2004 – Chella d' 'e rrose (D.V. More Record)
2004 – Mario Merola contiene medley (D.V. More Record)
2004 – Cient'anne (album)|Cient'anne (D.V. More Record)
2004 – Mario Merola – Storia della canzone napoletana (Retro Gold)
2004 – Mario Merola canta Napoli (Joker)
2005 – I protagonisti vol. 2 (D.V. More Record)
2005 – 'A peggio offesa sta 'ncoppa all'onore (Nuova Canaria)
2005 – Bella Napoli vol. 2 (D.V. More Record)
2005 – Numero 1 (Mario Merola)|Numero 1 (D.V. More Record)
2005 – Cinematografo (Doppio CD)|Cinematografo (MR. Music)
2005 – I miei festival di Napoli (Cristiani Music Italy)
2005 – Napoli ieri e oggi (Raccolta)|Napoli ieri e oggi (D.V. More Record)
2005 – 'A Fede (D.V. More Record)
2005 – Disco oro (MR Music)
2005 – Due in uno: La sceneggiata Mario Merola & [[Nino D'Angelo (Nuova Canaria)
2005 – Napoli (Mario Merola)|Napoli (D.V. More Record)
2005 – A città 'e Pulecenella – Tangentopoli (MR Music)
2005 – Collezione (Mario Merola)|Collezione (Disco Più)
2005 – Quatt'anne ammore (D.V. More Record)
2005 – O'Rre da sceneggiata (MR Music)
2005 – Napule ca se ne va (MR Music)
2005 – Mario Merola the classic collection (Azzurra Music)
2006 – Carosello napoletano (Raccolta)|Carosello napoletano (MR Music)
2006 – Giuramento (raccolta)|Giuramento (Duck Record)
2006 – Napoli prima e dopo 45 successi – Mario Merola, Nino D'Angelo, Gigi D'Alessio (D.V. More Record)
2006 – I grandi successi (Mario Merola)|I grandi successi (Music Time)
2006 – Bar Napoli (Mediane)
2007 – Core 'e Napule Mario Merola & Nino D'Angelo (Saar Srl, Cd 8525)
2007 – Antologia sonora della canzone napoletana - cofanetto 2 (Phonotype, SFN3 2072)
2007 – Antologia sonora della canzone napoletana - cofanetto 3 (Phonotype, SFN3 2073)
2007 – Antologia sonora della canzone napoletana - cofanetto 4 (Phonotype, SFN3 2074)
2007 – Antologia sonora della canzone napoletana - cofanetto 5 (Phonotype, SFN3 2075)
2007 – Antologia sonora della canzone napoletana - cofanetto 7 (Phonotype, SFN3 2077)
2007 – Antologia sonora della canzone napoletana - cofanetto 8 (Phonotype, SFN3 2078)
2007 – Antologia sonora della canzone napoletana - cofanetto 9 (Phonotype, SFN3 2079)
2007 – Antologia sonora della canzone napoletana - cofanetto 13 (Phonotype, SFN3 2083)
2007 – Antologia sonora della canzone napoletana - cofanetto 14 (Phonotype, SFN3 2084)
2007 – Antologia sonora della canzone napoletana - cofanetto 15 (Phonotype, SFN3 2085)
2008 – 'A collezione 1 - 'O mare 'e margellina (Zeus Record, ZS 0052)
2008 – 'A collezione 2 - 'A sciurara (Zeus Record, ZS 0222)
2008 – 'A collezione 3 - Malommo (Zeus Record, ZS 2062)
2008 – 'A collezione 4 - Surriento d' 'e nnammurate (Zeus Record, ZS 2112)
2008 – 'A collezione 5 - Fantasia (Zeus Record, ZS 2122)
2008 – 'A collezione 6 - Comm' 'a 'nu sciummo (Zeus Record, ZS 2132)
2008 – Gli Indimenticabili vol. 2 Mario Merola (Nuova Canaria)
2008 – Malu Figlio - Mario Merola & Pino Marchese (Nuova Canaria)
2008 – Amori e tradimenti (Nuova Canaria)
2008 – So' nnato carcerato (Nuova Canaria)
2009 – La tradizione. La sceneggiata (Lucky Planets)
2009 – I miei successi (Mario Merola)|I miei successi (Zeus Record)
2010 – Canta Napoli 10 (Joker)
2010 – Il meglio di Mario Merola (Joker)
2010 – Senza guapparia (Fonotil)
2010 – Cinematografo (album)|Cinematografo (Phonotype, CD 0240)
2011 – Viva Napoli vol. 3 (Phonotype, CD 0035)
2013 – Le sceneggiate di Mario Merola (Replay Music)

Individual
1992 – Cient'Anne (with Gigi D'Alessio)
1992 – Futtetènne (with Cristiano Malgioglio)
2001 – Ll'urdemo emigrante (with Francesco Merola)
2002 – Si tu papà (with Cinzia Oscar)
2002 – Mamma de vicule (with Giovanna De Sio)
2004 – Get another rum (with I Corleone)
2004 – E' figli 'e Napule (with Antonio Ottaiano)
2005 – Cu' mme (with Rita Siani)

Filmography 
Sgarro alla camorra (1973)
L'ultimo guappo, regia di Alfonso Brescia (1978)
Napoli... serenata calibro 9 (1978)
Il mammasantissima  (1979)
From Corleone to Brooklyn (Da Corleone a Brooklyn) (1979)
The New Godfathers (I contrabbandieri di Santa Lucia) (1979)
Hunted City (Sbirro, la tua legge è lenta... la mia no!) (1979)
Napoli... la camorra sfida e la città risponde (1979)
Zappatore (1980)
La tua vita per mio figlio (1980)
Carcerato (1981)
The Mafia Triangle (Napoli, Palermo, New York – Il triangolo della camorra) (1981)
Lacrime napulitane (1981)
I figli... so' pezzi 'e core (1981)
Tradimento (1982)
Giuramento (1982)
Torna, regia di Stelvio Massi (1984)
Guapparia, regia di Stelvio Massi (1984)
Corsia preferenziale, movie TV (1995)
Un posto al sole, serie TV (1996)
Cient'anne (1999)
Sud Side Stori (2000)
Totò Sapore e la magica storia della pizza, voice of Vincenzone (2003)

External links

  Photographic essay

References 

1934 births
2006 deaths
Musicians from Naples
Italian male film actors
20th-century Italian  male singers